Reali is an Italian surname. Notable people with the surname include:

Antonio Reali (1891–1975), Italian World War I flying ace
Cristiana Reali (born 1965), French actress
Emiliano Reali (born 1976), Italian writer
Ivan Reali (born 1991), Italian footballer
Mario Reali (born 1939), Italian poet and writer
Tony Reali (born 1978), American television host

Italian-language surnames